KOLG (90.9 FM) is Guam's traditional religious and inspirational programmed radio station. The station is owned and operated by the Roman Catholic Archbishop of Agaña, and is licensed to Hagåtña. The station signed on the air on September 20, 1991.

The station was assigned the KOLG call letters by the Federal Communications Commission on September 20, 1991.

The station's original tower was toppled by Super Typhoon Pongsona in 2002; sailors from the USS Frank Cable helped to remove it. In 2019, the archdiocese warned that KOLG needed $50,000 to $100,000 in additional operating funds or it would close.

Notes

References

External links 
 

Catholic radio stations
Radio stations established in 1991
1991 establishments in Guam
OLG
Hagåtña, Guam
Roman Catholic Archdiocese of Agaña